Poprad Civic Arena (Slovak: Zimný štadión mesta Poprad) is an arena in Poprad, Slovakia.  It is primarily used for ice hockey and is the home ice of HK Poprad (playing in the Slovak Extraliga). It has a capacity of 4,500 people and was built in 1973 and renovated in 2011. During the 2011–12 KHL season, it was also the home arena of Lev Poprad, which was playing in the Kontinental Hockey League.

Notable events
An overview of some sport events:

1987
1987 Winter Universiade

1994
1994 IIHF World Championship Group C1

1999
1999 Winter Universiade

2017
2017 IIHF World Under-18 Championship

References

External links

Indoor ice hockey venues in Slovakia
Poprad
Sport in Poprad
Poprad
HC Lev Poprad
Sports venues completed in 1973